Titus Heckel is a Canadian film director and screenwriter from Vancouver, British Columbia. He is most noted for his 2020 film Chained, for which he received three Vancouver Film Critics Circle award nominations at the Vancouver Film Critics Circle Awards 2020, for Best Screenplay in a Canadian Film, Best British Columbia Film and One to Watch.

His first feature film, With Child, was released in 2014. He also wrote and directed the short film The Better Man (2012), and wrote the television thriller film A Deadly Vendetta (2018).

References

External links

21st-century Canadian screenwriters
21st-century Canadian male writers
Canadian male screenwriters
Film directors from Vancouver
Writers from Vancouver
Living people
Year of birth missing (living people)